Lesser Slave Lake Wildland Provincial Park is a wildland provincial park in central Alberta, Canada. The park is included in the Upper Athabasca Region Land Use Framework.

Location
It is on the north shore of Lesser Slave Lake from Grouard Indian Reserve 231, now Kapawe'no 231, in the east to Hilliard's Bay Provincial Park in the west. The park is accessed via township road 752A.

Ecology 
The park protects an example of the Central Mixedwood subregion of the Boreal Forest natural region of Alberta. In the National Ecological Framework for Canada used by Environment and Climate Change Canada, the park is in the McLennan Plain ecodistrict of the Peace Lowland ecoregion in the Central Boreal Plains ecoprovince of the Boreal Plains Ecozone. Under the OneEarth classification (previously World Wildlife Fund), the park is in the Mid-Canada Boreal Plains Forests ecoregion of the Mid-Canada Boreal Plains & Foothill Forests bioregion.

Geography 
Most of this area of the park is wetlands.

Climate 
The Köppen climate classification of the park is Continental, Subarctic (Dfc) characterized by long, cold winters, and short, warm to cool summers.

Natural history themes 
The park and adjacent lake contain contain habitat for fish spawning and rearing as well as areas for waterfowl staging and production. The park is also a critical moose wintering range. Bald eagles and osprey nest in the park.

Activities 
The park allows off-highway vehicle use. Backcountry hiking is allowed. Hunting and fishing are permitted when licensed.

See also 
 List of provincial parks in Alberta
 List of Canadian provincial parks

References

External links 
 

Parks in Alberta
Provincial parks of Alberta